Lingyun Gu (born in 1976) is an expert in Artificial Intelligence, founder, chairman of the board  and CEO of IceKredit, independent director of Guilin Bank, board member of Nanjing International School, adjunct professor of Singapore University of Technology and Design.

Gu got his PhD degree in Computer Science at Carnegie Mellon University. In 2009, Gu worked as quantitative strategist at Translucent Capital. Then he joined ZestFinance as the head of modeling team in 2011.After two years, Gu joined Turbo Financial Group, where he served as co-founder, board member, and chief risk officer.In 2014, Gu became an entrepreneur in residence and investment advisor at IDG-Accel Partners.In 2015, Gu founded IceKredit, focuses on applying artificial intelligence technologies to provide powerful insights, innovative models to make smarter decisions for various industries, especially for financial business.

References

1976 births
Living people
Machine learning researchers